Doctor of the Church (Latin: doctor "teacher"), also referred to as Doctor of the Universal Church (Latin: Doctor Ecclesiae Universalis), is a title given by the Catholic Church to saints recognized as having made a significant contribution to theology or doctrine through their research, study, or writing.

, the Catholic Church has named 37 Doctors of the Church. Of these, the 18 who died before the Great Schism of 1054 are also held in high esteem by the Eastern Orthodox Church, although it does not use the formal title "Doctor of the Church".

Among the 37 recognised Doctors, 28 are from the West and nine from the East; four are women and thirty-three are men; one abbess, three nuns, one tertiary associated with a religious order; 19 bishops, twelve priests, one deacon; 27 from Europe, three from Africa, and seven from Asia. More Doctors (twelve) lived in the fourth century than any other; eminent Christian writers of the first, second, and third centuries are usually referred to as the Ante-Nicene Fathers. The shortest period between death and nomination was that of Alphonsus Liguori, who died in 1787 and was named a Doctor in 1871 – a period of 84 years; the longest was that of Irenaeus, which took more than eighteen centuries.

Some other churches have similar categories with various names.

Before the 16th century 
In the Western church four outstanding "Fathers of the Church" attained this honour in the early Middle Ages: Gregory the Great, Ambrose, Augustine of Hippo, and Jerome. The "four Doctors" became a commonplace notion among scholastic theologians, and a decree of Boniface VIII (1298) ordering their feasts to be kept as doubles throughout the Latin Church is contained in his sixth book of Decretals (cap. "Gloriosus", de relique. et vener. sanctorum, in Sexto, III, 22).

In the Byzantine Church, three Doctors were pre-eminent: John Chrysostom, Basil the Great, and Gregory of Nazianzus. The feasts of these three saints were made obligatory throughout the Eastern Empire by Leo VI the Wise. A common feast was later instituted in their honour on 30 January, called "the feast of the three Hierarchs". In the Menaea for that day it is related that the three Doctors appeared in a dream to John Mauropous, Bishop of Euchaita, and commanded him to institute a festival in their honour, in order to put a stop to the rivalries of their votaries and panegyrists.

This was under Alexius Comnenus (1081–1118; see "Acta SS.", 14 June, under St. Basil, c. xxxviii). But sermons for the feast are attributed in manuscripts to Cosmas Vestitor, who flourished in the tenth century. The three are as common in Eastern art as the four are in Western. Durandus (i, 3) remarks that Doctors should be represented with books in their hands. In the West analogy led to the veneration of four Eastern Doctors, Athanasius of Alexandria being added to the three hierarchs.

Catholic Church 

The details of the title, Doctor of the Church, vary from one autonomous ritual church to another.

Latin Church 

In the Latin Church, the four Latin Doctors "had already long been recognized" in the liturgy when the four Great Doctors of the Eastern Church, John Chrysostom, Basil the Great, Gregory of Nazianzus, and Athanasius of Alexandria were recognized in 1568 by Pope Pius V.

To these names others have subsequently been added. The requisite conditions are enumerated as three: eminens doctrina, insignis vitae sanctitas, Ecclesiae declaratio (i.e. eminent learning, a high degree of sanctity, and proclamation by the church). Benedict XIV explains the third as a declaration by the supreme pontiff or by a general council. But though general councils have acclaimed the writings of certain Doctors, no council has actually conferred the title of Doctor of the Church. The procedure involved extending to the Catholic Church the use of the Divine Office and Mass of the saint in which the title of doctor is applied to him. 

The decree is issued by the Congregation for the Causes of the Saints and approved by the pope, after a careful examination, if necessary, of the saint's writings. It is not in any way an ex cathedra decision, nor does it even amount to a declaration that no error is to be found in the teaching of the Doctor. It is, indeed, well known that the very greatest of them are not wholly immune from error. Formally no martyrs were on the list, since the Office and the Mass had been for Confessors. Hence, as Benedict XIV pointed out during his pontificate, Ignatius of Antioch, Irenaeus of Lyons, and Cyprian of Carthage were not called Doctors of the Church. This changed in 2022 when Pope Francis declared Irenaeus of Lyons the first martyred Doctor.

The Doctors' works vary greatly in subject and form. Augustine of Hippo was one of the most prolific writers in Christian antiquity and wrote in almost every genre. Some, such as Pope Gregory the Great and Ambrose of Milan, were prominent writers of letters. Pope Leo the Great, Pope Gregory the Great, Peter Chrysologus, Bernard of Clairvaux, Anthony of Padua and Lawrence of Brindisi left many homilies. Catherine of Siena, Teresa of Ávila, John of the Cross and Thérèse de Lisieux wrote works of mystical theology. Athanasius of Alexandria and Robert Bellarmine defended the church against heresy. Bede the Venerable wrote biblical commentaries and theological treatises. Systematic theologians include the Scholastic philosophers Anselm of Canterbury, Albert the Great, and Thomas Aquinas.

In the 1920 encyclical Spiritus Paraclitus, Pope Benedict XV refers to Jerome as the church's "Greatest Doctor".

Until 1970, no woman had been named a Doctor of the Church. Since then four additions to the list have been women: Teresa of Ávila (also known as Saint Teresa of Jesus) and Catherine of Siena by Pope Paul VI; Thérèse de Lisieux (also known as Saint Therese of the Child Jesus and of the Holy Face), "the Little Flower" by Pope John Paul II; and Hildegard of Bingen by Benedict XVI. Teresa and Thérèse were both Discalced Carmelites, Catherine was a Dominican, and Hildegard was a Benedictine nun.

Traditionally, in the Liturgy, the Office of Doctors was distinguished from that of Confessors by two changes: the Gospel reading Vos estis sal terrae ("You are the salt of the earth"), Matthew 5:13–19, and the eighth Respond at Matins, from Ecclesiasticus 15:5, In medio Ecclesiae aperuit os ejus, * Et implevit eum Deus spiritu sapientiae et intellectus. * Jucunditatem et exsultationem thesaurizavit super eum. ("In the midst of the Church he opened his mouth, * And God filled him with the spirit of wisdom and understanding. * He heaped upon him a treasure of joy and gladness.") The Nicene Creed was also recited at Mass, which is normally not said except on Sundays and the highest-ranking feast days. The 1962 revisions to the Missal dropped the Creed from feasts of Doctors and abolished the title and the Common of Confessors, instituting a distinct Common of Doctors.

On 20 August 2011, Pope Benedict XVI announced that he would soon declare John of Ávila a Doctor of the Church.  Although no official announcement was given, it was reported in December 2011 that Pope Benedict intended to declare Hildegard of Bingen as a Doctor of the Church despite her not yet having been formally canonized by the papacy. Hildegard of Bingen was officially declared to be a saint of the Catholic Church by Pope Benedict XVI on 10 May 2012, clearing the way for her to be named a Doctor of the Church. Pope Benedict formally declared John of Ávila and Hildegard of Bingen to be Doctors of the Church on 7 October 2012. 

Pope Francis declared the 10th century Armenian monk Gregory of Narek to be the 36th Doctor of the Church on 21 February 2015. The decision was somewhat controversial. According to critics of Pope Francis' decision, Gregory was a monk of the Armenian Apostolic Church, which, like other Oriental Orthodox Churches, split off from the rest of Christendom over the Council of Chalcedon in 451 AD. Therefore, Gregory is seen by some as a Monophysite who was in union with neither Catholic nor Eastern Orthodox Christians at the time of his death in 1003. 

The Oriental Orthodox churches, among which the Armenian Apostolic Church is numbered,  are Miaphysites; however, defenders of the decision have cited historical evidence that Narek Monastery, where Gregory lived and died, was a center of opposition to Monophysitism from inside the Armenian Church. It is also cited that Gregory of Narek was prior to the move by Pope Francis listed in the Roman Martyrology with a feast day of February 27 and that members of the Armenian Catholic Church have always had a strong devotion to him and his writings.

It was not until 25 January 2021 that the Congregation for Divine Worship and the Discipline of the Sacraments decreed the insertion into the Roman Rite liturgical books of the three Doctors declared by Benedict XVI, along with Gregory of Narek, more recently declared by Pope Francis.

In October 2019, the Polish Catholic Bishops Conference formally petitioned Pope Francis to consider making Pope John Paul II a Doctor of the Church in an official proclamation, in recognition of his contributions to theology, philosophy, and Catholic literature, as well as the formal documents (encyclicals, apostolic letters, bulls, motu proprio documents, homilies, and speeches) that he issued. The Archbishop of San Salvador, El Salvador has petitioned Pope Francis to name St Oscar Romero, martyred in 1980 while he was archbishop there, who held a doctorate and was a reliably orthodox figure even as he grew to advocate for the plight of his people during the civil war there, as a Doctor of the Church. 

Romero and John Paul II are known to be widely respected figures today, even by many in the Eastern Catholic, Eastern Orthodox, and Protestant denominations, or who are not religious or are agnostic. If the Salvadorian bishops petition is granted St Oscar Romero would become the second Doctor of the Church who was martyred.

List of Doctors 
(For earlier authorities on Christian doctrine, see Church Fathers and Ante-Nicene Fathers)
* indicates a saint who is also held in high esteem by the Eastern Orthodox Church.

Other recognised Doctors 
In addition, parts of the Catholic Church have recognised other individuals with this title. In Spain, Fulgentius of Cartagena, Ildephonsus of Toledo and Leander of Seville have been recognized with this title. In 2007 Pope Benedict XVI, in his encyclical Spe Salvi, called Maximus the Confessor "the great Greek Doctor of the Church", though the Congregation for the Causes of Saints considers this declaration an informal one.

Scholastic epithets 

Though not named Doctors of the Church or even canonized, many of the more celebrated doctors of theology and law of the Middle Ages were given an epithet which expressed the nature of their expertise.  Among these are Bl. John Duns Scotus, Doctor subtilis (Subtle Doctor); Bl. Ramon Llull, Doctor illuminatus (Illuminated Doctor); Bl. John of Ruysbroeck, Doctor divinus ecstaticus (Ecstatic Doctor); Alexander of Hales, Doctor irrefragabilis (Unanswerable Doctor); Roger Bacon, "Doctor Mirabilis" (Wondrous Doctor); Gregory of Rimini, Doctor authenticus (Authentic Doctor); Jean Gerson, Doctor christianissimus (Most Christian Doctor); Nicholas of Cusa, Doctor christianus (Christian Doctor); and the priest and professor Francisco Suárez, Doctor eximius (Exceptional Doctor). In this same line are the Latin epithets assigned to various Doctors of the Church from the Middle Ages onwards, some displaying more enthusiasm than clarity.

Syro-Malabar Catholic Church
The Syro-Malabar Catholic Church recognises Ambrose, Jerome, Gregory, Augustine, Athanasius, Basil, Gregory of Nazianzus and John Chrysostom, as well as Ephrem the Syrian, Isaac the Elder, Pope Leo I, John of Damascus, Cyril of Alexandria, Cyril of Jerusalem, Epiphanius of Salamis and Gregory of Nyssa.

Chaldean Catholic Church 
The Chaldean Catholic Church honours as doctor Polycarp, Eustathius of Antioch, Meletius, Alexander of Jerusalem, Athanasius, Basil, Cyril of Alexandria, Gregory Nazianzus, Gregory of Nyssa, John Chrysostom, Fravitta of Constantinople, Ephrem the Syrian, Jacob of Nisibis, Jacob of Serugh, Isaac of Armenia, Isaac of Nineveh, and Maruthas of Martyropolis.

Eastern Orthodox Church 
The Eastern Orthodox Church honors many of the pre-schism saints as well, but the term "Doctor of the Church" is not applied in the same way. One consistent use of the category is the trio of Basil the Great, Gregory of Nazianzus and John Chrysostom, recognized as universal teachers and known as the Three Holy Hierarchs. The church also recognizes three saints with the title Theologos (Theologian): John the Evangelist, Gregory of Nazianzus and Symeon the New Theologian.

Armenian Church 
The Armenian Apostolic Church recognizes the Twelve Holy Teachers (Vardapets) of the Church
Hierotheus the Thesmothete
Dionysius the Areopagite
Pope Sylvester I
Athanasius of Alexandria
Cyril of Alexandria
Ephrem the Syrian
Basil the Great
Gregory Nazianzus
Gregory of Nyssa
Epiphanius of Salamis
John Chrysostom
Cyril of Jerusalem.

They also recognize their own saints Mesrob, Yeghishe, Movses Khorenatsi, David the Invincible, Gregory of Narek, Nerses III the Builder, and Nerses of Lambron as "Doctors of the Armenian Church" or the "Armenian Doctors."

Assyrian Church of the East 
The Assyrian Church of the East recognizes Yeghishe, Diodorus of Tarsus, Theodore of Mopsuestia, and Nestorius as Doctors of the Church.

Anglicanism 
The churches of the Anglican Communion tend not to use the term "Doctor of the Church" in their calendars of saints, preferring expressions such as Teacher of the Faith. Those thus recognized include figures from before and after the Reformation, most of whom are chosen among those already recognized as in the Catholic Church and Eastern Orthodox Church. Those designated as Teachers of the Faith in the Church of England's calendar of saints are as follows:

Basil the Great
Gregory of Nazianzus
Hilary of Poitiers
Francis de Sales
Thomas Aquinas
Cyril of Jerusalem
Frederick Denison Maurice
William of Ockham
Anselm
Catherine of Siena
Athanasius
Ephrem of Syria
Sundar Singh of India
Cyril of Alexandria
Irenæus
Bonaventure
Gregory of Nyssa and his sister Macrina
Brooke Foss Westcott
Jeremy Taylor
Bernard of Clairvaux
Augustine of Hippo
Gregory the Great
John Chrysostom
Sergius of Radonezh
Jerome
Teresa of Ávila
Therese of Lisieux
Richard Hooker
William Temple
Leo the Great
John of Damascus
Ambrose
John of the Cross

Since all of the above appear in the calendar at the level of Lesser Festival or Commemoration, their celebration is optional. Similarly, because "In the Calendar of the Saints, diocesan and other local provision may be made to supplement the national Calendar", those Doctors of the Church recognized by the Catholic Church may also be celebrated in the Church of England.

Lutheranism 
The Lutheran calendar of saints does not use the term "Doctor of the Church." The calendar of the Lutheran Church–Missouri Synod refers to Martin Luther by the title of "Doctor" in recognition of his academic degree, Doctor of Theology from the University of Wittenberg in 1512.

See also 

Fathers of the Church

References

Further reading 
Holweck, F. G., A Biographical Dictionary of the Saints. St. Louis, MO: B. Herder Book Co., 1924.

External links 

 

 
Groups of Roman Catholic saints
Types of saints
Christian terminology